The Enugu State University of Science and Technology (ESUT) is a university in Nigeria that was founded as  Anambra State University of Technology (ASUTECH) on 30 July 1980, by the  Executive  Governor of Anambra State, Chief Dr Jim Ifeanyichukwu Nwobodo . The creation of Enugu State out of Anambra State in 1991 by the then Military President General Ibrahim Gbadamasi Babangida,  transformed ASUTECH  into Enugu State University of Science and Technology.

History
The university was conceived with the aim to establish an institution that must be closely related to society, its industry and above all, serve as a catalyst in the technological advancement of the people, hence the university's motto remains "Technology for Service".

The enactment of the law establishing the university by the then Anambra State House of Assembly was followed by the appointment of professor Kenneth Onwuka Dike as the first president and chief executive of the university and the inauguration of the first Provisional Council of the university with professor Onwuka Dike as its first chairman/president. (Oct 1980 – Oct 1983).

Later, Professor Chinua Achebe was appointed Pro-Chancellor and Chairman of Council with Professor Chiweyite Ejike as Vice Chancellor (1987 – 1988). The management team of the university at that time included Mr. F.C. Eze – Registrar, Mr. G.C. Akachukwu – Acting Bursar and Dr. (Mrs.) Ngozi Ene – University Librarian. At the end of Professor Achebe's tenure, Professor Gaius Igboeli was appointed the next Pro-Chancellor and Chairman of the University Governing Council. (1989 – 1991) while Professor Chiweyite Ejike was still the Vice Chancellor.

Following the creation of Enugu State in 1991 and the subsequent change of the name of the university to Enugu State University of Science and Technology, Hon, Justice Anthony Aniagolu was appointed the Pro-Chancellor and Chairman of the Governing Council with Prof. Julius Onuorah Onah as the Vice Chancellor (1992 – 1996). The Management team under Professor Onah included Dr. Fidelis Ogah as the Deputy Vice Chancellor, Mr. F.C. Eze as Registrar, Dr. (Mrs.) Ngozi Eneh – University Librarian and Mr. G.C. Akachukwu – Bursar. At the end of the tenure of Professor Julius Onah came in quick succession, Professor T.C. Nwodo as acting Vice Chancellor and later Professor Mark Anikpo as acting Vice Chancellor also.

A new Pro-Chancellor and Chairman of Council in the person of Igwe Charles Abangwu with Professor Samuel C. Chukwu as the Vice Chancellor (January 2000 – December 2003 were later put in place. The end tenure of Igwe Charles Abangwu was followed by the appointment of Igwe Francis Okwor (now late) as Pro-Chancellor and Chairman of Council between January 2004 and August 2004. Following the death of the Pro-Chancellor, a Management Committee was inaugurated to govern the university between August 2004 and August 2006 with Chief Clement Okwor who was then, the Head of Service in Enugu State as its chairman.

Professor Ikechukwu Chidobem was later appointed the Vice Chancellor in 2006 to succeed Professor Chukwu. The Management team under Professor Chidobem included Mr. Simon N.P. Nwankwo as Registrar, Mr. Fabian Ugwu as Bursar and Mr George Igwebuike as acting University Librarian. A new Pro-Chancellor and Chairman of Council in the person of Barrister David Ogbodo was later appointed to replace the Management Committee in August 2006. Other members of the council include Prof. Fab. Onah, Prof. David Edeani, Chief G.O. Okereke, Mrs. Janet Ngene, Mrs. Fidelia Agu, Arc. Sylvester Chineke (now late) and Professor Nene Obianyo – Provost, College of Medicine.

Faculties & College
Faculty of Agricultural & Natural Resources Management
Faculty of Applied Natural Sciences
Faculty of Education
Faculty of Engineering
Faculty of Environmental Sciences
Faculty of Law
Faculty of Management Sciences
Faculty of Pharmaceutical Sciences
Faculty of Social Sciences.
College of Medicine

Governing Council
 His Lordship, Most Rev. (Prof.) Godfrey I. Onah - Pro Chancellor
 Professor Aloysius-Michaels Nnabugwu Okolie  - Vice-Chancellor
 Professor Chike E. Nwoha  - Deputy Vice-Chancellor
 Mr. Ambrose George Ugwu - Registrar/Secretary to Council

Principal officers
 Vice-Chancellor - Professor Aloysius-Michaels Nnabugwu Okolie 
Deputy Vice-Chancellor - Professor Chike E. Nwoha 
Registrar - Mr. Ambrose George Ugwu
Bursar - Dr. Augustine Ikechukwu Ojeh
University Librarian - Dr. Ezema Ifeanyi Jonas

Notable alumni
 
 
Chigozie Atuanya, Nigerian actor, producer and entrepreneur
Blossom Chukwujekwu, Nigerian actor
Sandra Ezekwesili, Nigerian Broadcast Journalist, Radio Presenter, Public Speaker and Compere
Osinakachukwu Ideozu, Nigerian businessman and People's Democratic Party politician
Daniel Lloyd, Nigerian actor. 
Stephen Ocheni, Nigerian professor
Mao Ohuabunwa, Nigerian politician, businessman 
Tessy Okoli, Provost of Federal College of Education (Technical), Umunze
Nnamdi Okonkwo, chief executive officer/ managing director of Fidelity Bank Nigeria
Chika Okpala, Nigerian comedian
Lawrence Onochie, Nigerian pastor and public speaker
Nkiru Sylvanus, Nigerian actress 
Dave Umahi, Governor of Ebonyi State

References

External links
 Enugu State University of Science & Technology - official site.
 Enugu State University of Science & Technology - Universities in Nigeria.

Enugu
Buildings and structures in Enugu State
 
1979 establishments in Nigeria
Educational institutions established in 1979
Technological universities in Nigeria
Public universities in Nigeria